You River may refer to the following rivers in China:

 You River (Guangxi), a tributary of the Yong River
 You River (Tributary of Yuan River), a tributary of the Yuan River in Hunan, Hubei, Chongqing and Guizhou
 You River was a Song-dynasty river in northern China